The Beevor Baronetcy, of Hethel in the County of Norfolk, is a title in the Baronetage of Great Britain. It was created on 22 January 1784 for the prominent agriculturalist Thomas Beevor. The title has descended in the direct line from father to son.

Beevor baronets, of Hethel (1784)
Sir Thomas Beevor, 1st Baronet (1726–1814)
Sir Thomas Beevor, 2nd Baronet (1753–1820)
Sir Thomas Branthwaite Beevor, 3rd Baronet (1798–1879)
Sir Thomas Beevor, 4th Baronet (1823–1885)
Sir Hugh Reeve Beevor, 5th Baronet (1858–1939)
Sir Thomas Lubbock Beevor, 6th Baronet (1897–1943)
Sir Thomas Agnew Beevor, 7th Baronet (1929–2017)
Sir Thomas Hugh Cunliffe Beevor, 8th Baronet (born 1962)

The heir apparent is the current holder's elder son, Thomas William Harvey Beevor (born 1990).

Notes

References
Kidd, Charles, Williamson, David (editors). Debrett's Peerage and Baronetage (1990 edition). New York: St Martin's Press, 1990, 

Beevor
1784 establishments in Great Britain